A list of films produced in Italy in 1959 (see 1959 in film):

References

Bibliography

External links

1959
Films
Italian